Eduardo López (born 5 September 1926, date of death unknown) was a Guatemalan fencer. He competed in the individual foil, sabre and épée events at the 1952 Summer Olympics.

References

External links
 

1926 births
Year of death missing
Guatemalan male épée fencers
Olympic fencers of Guatemala
Fencers at the 1952 Summer Olympics
Guatemalan male foil fencers
Guatemalan male sabre fencers